The term dialect (from Latin , , from the Ancient Greek word ,  'discourse', from ,  'through' and ,  'I speak') can refer to either of two distinctly different types of linguistic phenomena:

One usage refers to a variety of a language that is a characteristic of a particular group of the language's speakers. Under this definition, the dialects or varieties of a particular language are closely related and, despite their differences, are most often largely mutually intelligible, especially if geographically close to one another in a dialect continuum. The term is applied most often to regional speech patterns, but a dialect may also be defined by other factors, such as social class or ethnicity. A dialect that is associated with a particular social class can be termed a sociolect, a dialect that is associated with a particular ethnic group can be termed an ethnolect, and a geographical/regional dialect may be termed a regiolect (alternative terms include 'regionalect', 'geolect', and 'topolect'). According to this definition, any variety of a given language can be classified as a "dialect", including any standardized varieties. In this case, the distinction between the "standard language" (i.e. the "standard" dialect of a particular language) and the "nonstandard" (vernacular) dialects of the same language is often arbitrary and based on social, political, cultural, or historical considerations or prevalence and prominence. In a similar way, the definitions of the terms "language" and "dialect" may overlap and are often subject to debate, with the differentiation between the two classifications often grounded in arbitrary or sociopolitical motives. The term "dialect" is however sometimes restricted to mean "non-standard variety", particularly in non-specialist settings and non-English linguistic traditions.

The other usage of the term "dialect", specific to colloquial settings in a few countries like Italy (see dialetto), France (see patois),  much of East Central Europe, and the Philippines, carries a pejorative undertone and underlines the politically and socially subordinated status of a non-national language to the country's single official language. In this case, these "dialects" are not actual dialects in the same sense as in the first usage, as they do not derive from the politically dominant language and are therefore not one of its varieties, but they evolved in a separate and parallel way and may thus better fit various parties' criteria for a separate language. These "dialects" may be historically cognate with and share genetic roots in the same subfamily as the dominant national language and may even, to a varying degree, share some mutual intelligibility with the latter. However, in this sense, unlike in the first usage, these "dialects" may be better defined as separate languages from the standard or national language and the standard or national language would not itself be considered a "dialect", as it is the dominant language in a particular state, be it in terms of linguistic prestige, social or political (e.g. official) status, predominance or prevalence, or all of the above. The term "dialect" used this way implies a political connotation, being mostly used to refer to low-prestige languages (regardless of their actual degree of distance from the national language), languages lacking institutional support, or those perceived as "unsuitable for writing". The designation "dialect" is also used popularly to refer to the unwritten or non-codified languages of developing countries or isolated areas, where the term "vernacular language" would be preferred by linguists.

Features that distinguish dialects from each other can be found in lexicon (vocabulary) and grammar, as well as in pronunciation (phonology, including prosody). Where the salient distinctions are only or mostly to be observed in pronunciation, the more specific term accent may be used instead of dialect.  Differences that are largely concentrated in lexicon may be creoles in their own right. When lexical differences are mostly concentrated in the specialized vocabulary of a profession or other organization, they are jargons; differences in vocabulary that are deliberately cultivated to exclude outsiders or to serve as shibboleths are known as cryptolects (or "cant") and include slangs and argots. The particular speech patterns used by an individual are referred to as that person's idiolect.

To classify subsets of language as dialects, linguists take into account linguistic distance. The dialects of a language with a writing system will operate at different degrees of distance from the standardized written form. Some dialects of a language are not mutually intelligible in spoken form, leading to debate as to whether they are regiolects or separate languages.

Standard and nonstandard dialects
A standard dialect also known as a "standardized language" is supported by institutions. Such institutional support may include any or all of the following: government recognition or designation; formal presentation in schooling as the "correct" form of a language; informal monitoring of everyday usage; published grammars, dictionaries, and textbooks that set forth a normative spoken and written form; and an extensive formal literature (be it prose, poetry, non-fiction, etc.) that uses it. An example of a standardized language is the French language which is supported by the Académie Française institution.

A nonstandard dialect has a complete grammar and vocabulary, but is usually not the beneficiary of institutional support.

Dialect as linguistic variety of a language 
The term is applied most often to regional speech patterns, but a dialect may also be defined by other factors, such as social class or ethnicity. A dialect that is associated with a particular social class can be termed a sociolect. A dialect that is associated with a particular ethnic group can be termed an ethnolect.

A geographical/regional dialect may be termed a regiolect (alternative terms include 'regionalect', 'geolect', and 'topolect'). According to this definition, any variety of a given language can be classified as "a dialect", including any standardized varieties. In this case, the distinction between the "standard language" (i.e. the "standard" dialect of a particular language) and the "nonstandard" (vernacular) dialects of the same language is often arbitrary and based on social, political, cultural, or historical considerations or prevalence and prominence. In a similar way, the definitions of the terms "language" and "dialect" may overlap and are often subject to debate, with the differentiation between the two classifications often grounded in arbitrary or sociopolitical motives. The term "dialect" is however sometimes restricted to mean "non-standard variety", particularly in non-specialist settings and non-English linguistic traditions.

Dialect or language 

There is no universally accepted criterion for distinguishing two different languages from two dialects (i.e. varieties) of the same language. A number of rough measures exist, sometimes leading to contradictory results. The distinction (dichotomy) between dialect and language is therefore subjective (arbitrary) and depends upon the user's preferred frame of reference. For example, there has been discussion about whether or not the Limón Creole English should be considered "a kind" of English or a different language. This creole is spoken in the Caribbean coast of Costa Rica (Central America) by descendants of Jamaican people. The position that Costa Rican linguists support depends upon which university they represent.  Another example is Scanian, which even, for a time, had its own ISO code.

Linguistic distance 

An important criterion for categorizing varieties of language is linguistic distance, for a variety to be considered a dialect, the linguistic distance between the two varieties must be low. Linguistic distance between spoken or written forms of language increases as the differences between the forms are characterized. For example, two languages with completely different syntactical structures would have a high linguistic distance, while a language with very few differences from another may be considered a dialect or a sibling of that language. Linguistic distance may be used to determine language families and language siblings.  For example, languages with little linguistic distance, like Dutch and German, are considered siblings. Dutch and German are siblings in the West-Germanic language group. Some language siblings are closer to each other in terms of linguistic distance than to other linguistic siblings. French and Spanish, siblings in the Romance Branch of the Indo-European group, are closer to each other than they are to any of the languages of the West-Germanic group. When languages are close in terms of linguistic distance, they resemble one another, hence why dialects are not considered linguistically distant to their parent language.

Mutual intelligibility 

One criterion, which is often considered to be purely linguistic, is that of mutual intelligibility: two varieties are said to be dialects of the same language if being a speaker of one variety confers sufficient knowledge to understand and be understood by a speaker of the other; otherwise, they are said to be different languages. However, this definition has often been criticized, especially in the case of a dialect continuum (or dialect chain), which contains a sequence of varieties, each mutually intelligible with the next, but where widely separated varieties may not be mutually intelligible.
Others have argued that the mutual intelligibility criterion suffers from a series of problems, citing the fact that mutual intelligibility occurs in varying degrees, and the potential difficulty in distinguishing between intelligibility and prior familiarity with the other variety. However, recent research suggests that these objections do not stand up to scrutiny, and that there is some empirical evidence in favor of using some form of the intelligibility criterion to distinguish between languages and dialects, though mutuality may not be as relevant as initially thought. The requirement for mutuality is abandoned by the Language Survey Reference Guide of SIL International, publishers of the Ethnologue and the registration authority for the ISO 639-3 standard for language codes. They define a dialect cluster as a central variety together with all those varieties whose speakers understand the central variety at a specified threshold level or higher. If the threshold level is high, usually between 70% and 85%, the cluster is designated as a language.

Sociolinguistic definitions 

Another occasionally used criterion for discriminating dialects from languages is the sociolinguistic notion of linguistic authority. According to this definition, two varieties are considered dialects of the same language if (under at least some circumstances) they would defer to the same authority regarding some questions about their language. For instance, to learn the name of a new invention, or an obscure foreign species of plant, speakers of Westphalian and East Franconian German might each consult a German dictionary or ask a German-speaking expert in the subject. Thus these varieties are said to be dependent on, or heteronomous with respect to, Standard German, which is said to be autonomous.

Maldonado Garcia (2015) defines language as well as dialect according to the above parameters and many more.

In contrast, speakers in the Netherlands of Low Saxon varieties similar to Westphalian would instead consult a dictionary of Standard Dutch. Similarly, although Yiddish is classified by linguists as a language in the High German group of languages and has some degree of mutual intelligibility with German, a Yiddish speaker would consult a Yiddish dictionary rather than a German dictionary in such a case.

Within this framework, W. A. Stewart defined a language as an autonomous variety together with all the varieties that are heteronomous with respect to it, noting that an essentially equivalent definition had been stated by Charles A. Ferguson and John J. Gumperz in 1960.
A heteronomous variety may be considered a dialect of a language defined in this way.
In these terms, Danish and Norwegian, though mutually intelligible to a large degree, are considered separate languages.
In the framework of Heinz Kloss, these are described as languages by ausbau (development) rather than by abstand (separation).

Dialect and language clusters 

In other situations, a closely related group of varieties possess considerable (though incomplete) mutual intelligibility, but none dominates the others.
To describe this situation, the editors of the Handbook of African Languages introduced the term dialect cluster as a classificatory unit at the same level as a language.
A similar situation, but with a greater degree of mutual unintelligibility, has been termed a language cluster.

In the Language Survey Reference Guide issued by SIL International, who produce Ethnologue, a dialect cluster is defined as a central variety together with a collection of varieties whose speakers can understand the central variety at a specified threshold level (usually between 70% and 85%) or higher. It is not required that peripheral varieties be understood by speakers of the central variety or of other peripheral varieties. A minimal set of central varieties providing coverage of a dialect continuum may be selected algorithmically from intelligibility data.

Political factors 
In many societies, however, a particular dialect, often the sociolect of the elite class, comes to be identified as the "standard" or "proper" version of a language by those seeking to make a social distinction and is contrasted with other varieties. As a result of this, in some contexts, the term "dialect" refers specifically to varieties with low social status. In this secondary sense of "dialect", language varieties are often called dialects rather than languages:
 if they have no standard or codified form,
 if they are rarely or never used in writing (outside reported speech),
 if the speakers of the given language do not have a state of their own,
 if they lack prestige with respect to some other, often standardised, variety.

The status of "language" is not solely determined by linguistic criteria, but it is also the result of a historical and political development. Romansh came to be a written language, and therefore it is recognized as a language, even though it is very close to the Lombardic alpine dialects and classical Latin. An opposite example is Chinese, whose variations such as Mandarin and Cantonese are often called dialects and not languages in China, despite their mutual unintelligibility.

National boundaries sometimes make the distinction between "language" and "dialect" an issue of political importance. A group speaking a separate "language" may be seen as having a greater claim to being a separate "people", and thus to be more deserving of its own independent state, while a group speaking a "dialect" may be seen as a sub-group, part of a bigger people, which must content itself with regional autonomy.

The Yiddish linguist Max Weinreich published the expression, A shprakh iz a dialekt mit an armey un flot (: "A language is a dialect with an army and navy") in YIVO Bleter 25.1, 1945, p. 13. The significance of the political factors in any attempt at answering the question "what is a language?" is great enough to cast doubt on whether any strictly linguistic definition, without a socio-cultural approach, is possible. This is illustrated by the frequency with which the army-navy aphorism is cited.

Terminology 
By the definition most commonly used by linguists, any linguistic variety can be considered a "dialect" of some language—"everybody speaks a dialect". According to that interpretation, the criteria above merely serve to distinguish whether two varieties are dialects of the same language or dialects of different languages.

The terms "language" and "dialect" are not necessarily mutually exclusive, although they are often perceived to be. Thus there is nothing contradictory in the statement "the language of the Pennsylvania Dutch is a dialect of German".

There are various terms that linguists may use to avoid taking a position on whether the speech of a community is an independent language in its own right or a dialect of another language. Perhaps the most common is "variety";  "lect" is another.  A more general term is "languoid", which does not distinguish between dialects, languages, and groups of languages, whether genealogically related or not.

Colloquial meaning of dialect
The colloquial meaning of dialect can be understood by example, e.g. in Italy (see dialetto), France (see patois) and the Philippines, carries a pejorative undertone and underlines the politically and socially subordinated status of a non-national language to the country's single official language. In other words, these "dialects" are not actual dialects in the same sense as in the first usage, as they do not derive from the politically dominant language and are therefore not one of its varieties, but instead they evolved in a separate and parallel way and may thus better fit various parties’ criteria for a separate language.

Despite this, these "dialects" may often be historically cognate and share genetic roots in the same subfamily as the dominant national language and may even, to a varying degree, share some mutual intelligibility with the latter. In this sense, unlike in the first usage, the national language would not itself be considered a "dialect", as it is the dominant language in a particular state, be it in terms of linguistic prestige, social or political (e.g. official) status, predominance or prevalence, or all of the above. The term "dialect" used this way implies a political connotation, being mostly used to refer to low-prestige languages (regardless of their actual degree of distance from the national language), languages lacking institutional support, or those perceived as "unsuitable for writing". The designation "dialect" is also used popularly to refer to the unwritten or non-codified languages of developing countries or isolated areas, where the term "vernacular language" would be preferred by linguists.

Dialect and accent
John Lyons writes that "Many linguists [...] subsume differences of accent under differences of dialect." In general, accent refers to variations in pronunciation, while dialect also encompasses specific variations in grammar and vocabulary.

Examples

Arabic 

There are three geographical zones in which Arabic is spoken (Jastrow 2002). Zone I is categorized as the area in which Arabic was spoken before the rise of Islam. It is the Arabian Peninsula, excluding the areas where southern Arabian was spoken. Zone II is categorized as the areas to which Arabic speaking peoples moved as a result of the conquests of Islam. Included in Zone II are the Levant, Egypt, North Africa, Iraq, and some parts of Iran. The Egyptian, Sudanese, and Levantine dialects (including the Syrian dialect) are well documented, and widely spoken and studied. Zone III comprises the areas in which Arabic is spoken outside of the continuous Arabic Language area.

Spoken dialects of the Arabic language share the same writing system and share Modern Standard Arabic as their common prestige dialect used in writing. However, some are mutually unintelligible from each other. This leads to debate among scholars of the status of Arabic dialects as their own regionalects or possibly separate languages.

German 

When talking about the German language, the term German dialects is only used for the traditional regional varieties. That allows them to be distinguished from the regional varieties of modern standard German. The German dialects show a wide spectrum of variation. Some of them are not mutually intelligible. German dialectology traditionally names the major dialect groups after Germanic tribes from which they were assumed to have descended.

The extent to which the dialects are spoken varies according to a number of factors: In Northern Germany, dialects are less common than in the South. In cities, dialects are less common than in the countryside. In a public environment, dialects are less common than in a familiar environment.

The situation in Switzerland and Liechtenstein is different from the rest of the German-speaking countries. The Swiss German dialects are the default everyday language in virtually every situation, whereas standard German is only spoken in education, partially in media, and with foreigners not possessing knowledge of Swiss German. Most Swiss German speakers perceive standard German to be a foreign language.

The Low German and Low Franconian varieties spoken in Germany are often counted among the German dialects. This reflects the modern situation where they are roofed by standard German. This is different from the situation in the Middle Ages when Low German had strong tendencies towards an ausbau language.

The Frisian languages spoken in Germany and the Netherlands are excluded from the German dialects.

Italy

Italy is an often quoted example of a country where the second definition of the word "dialect" (dialetto) is most prevalent. Italy is in fact home to a vast array of separate languages, most of which lack mutual intelligibility with one another and have their own local varieties; twelve of them (Albanian, Catalan, German, Greek, Slovene, Croatian, French, Franco-Provençal, Friulian, Ladin, Occitan and Sardinian) underwent Italianization to a varying degree (ranging from the currently endangered state displayed by Sardinian and southern Italian Greek to the vigorous promotion of Germanic Tyrolean), but have been officially recognized as minority languages (minoranze linguistiche storiche), in light of their distinctive historical development. Yet, most of the regional languages spoken across the peninsula are often colloquially referred to in non-linguistic circles as Italian dialetti, since most of them, including the prestigious Neapolitan, Sicilian and Venetian, have adopted vulgar Tuscan as their reference language since the Middle Ages. However, all these languages evolved from Vulgar Latin in parallel with Italian, long prior to the popular diffusion of the latter throughout what is now Italy.

During the Risorgimento, Italian still existed mainly as a literary language, and only 2.5% of Italy's population could speak Italian. Proponents of Italian nationalism, like the Lombard Alessandro Manzoni, stressed the importance of establishing a uniform national language in order to better create an Italian national identity. With the unification of Italy in the 1860s, Italian became the official national language of the new Italian state, while the other ones came to be institutionally regarded as "dialects" subordinate to Italian, and negatively associated with a lack of education.

In the early 20th century, the conscription of Italian men from all throughout Italy during World War I is credited with having facilitated the diffusion of Italian among the less educated conscripted soldiers, as these men, who had been speaking various regional languages up until then, found themselves forced to communicate with each other in a common tongue while serving in the Italian military. With the popular spread of Italian out of the intellectual circles, because of the mass-media and the establishment of public education, Italians from all regions were increasingly exposed to Italian. While dialect levelling has increased the number of Italian speakers and decreased the number of speakers of other languages native to Italy, Italians in different regions have developed variations of standard Italian specific to their region. These variations of standard Italian, known as "regional Italian", would thus more appropriately be called dialects in accordance with the first linguistic definition of the term, as they are in fact derived from Italian, with some degree of influence from the local or regional native languages and accents.

The most widely spoken languages of Italy, which are not to be confused with regional Italian, fall within a family of which even Italian is part, the Italo-Dalmatian group. This wide category includes:
the complex of the Tuscan and Central Italian dialects, such as Romanesco in Rome, with the addition of some distantly Corsican-derived varieties (Gallurese and Sassarese) spoken in Northern Sardinia;
the Neapolitan group (also known as "Intermediate Meridional Italian"), which encompasses not only Naples' and Campania's speech but also a variety of related neighboring varieties like the Irpinian dialect, Abruzzese and Southern Marchegiano, Molisan, Northern Calabrian or Cosentino, and the Bari dialect. The Cilentan dialect of Salerno, in Campania, is considered significantly influenced by the Neapolitan and the below-mentioned language groups;
the Sicilian group (also known as "Extreme Meridional Italian"), including Salentino and centro-southern Calabrian.
Modern Italian is heavily based on the Florentine dialect of Tuscan. The Tuscan-based language that would eventually become modern Italian had been used in poetry and literature since at least the 12th century, and it first spread outside the Tuscan linguistic borders through the works of the so-called tre corone ("three crowns"): Dante Alighieri, Petrarch, and Giovanni Boccaccio. Florentine thus gradually rose to prominence as the volgare of the literate and upper class in Italy, and it spread throughout the peninsula and Sicily as the lingua franca among the Italian educated class as well as Italian travelling merchants. The economic prowess and cultural and artistic importance of Tuscany in the Late Middle Ages and the Renaissance further encouraged the diffusion of the Florentine-Tuscan Italian throughout Italy and among the educated and powerful, though local and regional languages remained the main languages of the common people.

Aside from the Italo-Dalmatian languages, the second most widespread family in Italy is the Gallo-Italic group, spanning throughout much of Northern Italy's languages and dialects (such as Piedmontese, Emilian-Romagnol, Ligurian, Lombard, Venetian, Sicily's and Basilicata's Gallo-Italic in southern Italy, etc.).

Finally, other languages from a number of different families follow the last two major groups: the Gallo-Romance languages (French, Occitan and its Vivaro-Alpine dialect, Franco-Provençal); the Rhaeto-Romance languages (Friulian and Ladin); the Ibero-Romance languages (Sardinia's Algherese); the Germanic Cimbrian, Southern Bavarian, Walser German and the Mòcheno language; the Albanian Arbëresh language; the Hellenic Griko language and Calabrian Greek; the Serbo-Croatian Slavomolisano dialect; and the various Slovene languages, including the Gail Valley dialect and Istrian dialect. The language indigenous to Sardinia, while being Romance in nature, is considered to be a specific linguistic family of its own, separate from the other Neo-Latin groups; it is often subdivided into the Centro-Southern and Centro-Northern dialects.

Though mostly mutually unintelligible, the exact degree to which all the Italian languages are mutually unintelligible varies, often correlating with geographical distance or geographical barriers between the languages; some regional Italian languages that are closer in geographical proximity to each other or closer to each other on the dialect continuum are more or less mutually intelligible. For instance, a speaker of purely Eastern Lombard, a language in Northern Italy's Lombardy region that includes the Bergamasque dialect, would have severely limited mutual intelligibility with a purely Italian speaker and would be nearly completely unintelligible to a Sicilian-speaking individual. Due to Eastern Lombard's status as a Gallo-Italic language, an Eastern Lombard speaker may, in fact, have more mutual intelligibility with an Occitan, Catalan, or French speaker than with an Italian or Sicilian speaker. Meanwhile, a Sicilian-speaking person would have a greater degree of mutual intelligibility with a speaker of the more closely related Neapolitan language, but far less mutual intelligibility with a person speaking Sicilian Gallo-Italic, a language that developed in isolated Lombard emigrant communities on the same island as the Sicilian language.

Today, the majority of Italian nationals are able to speak Italian, though many Italians still speak their regional language regularly or as their primary day-to-day language, especially at home with family or when communicating with Italians from the same town or region.

The Balkans 
The classification of speech varieties as dialects or languages and their relationship to other varieties of speech can be controversial and the verdicts inconsistent. Serbo-Croatian illustrates this point. Serbo-Croatian has two major formal variants (Serbian and Croatian). Both are based on the Shtokavian dialect and therefore mutually intelligible with differences found mostly in their respective local vocabularies and minor grammatical differences. Certain dialects of Serbia (Torlakian) and Croatia (Kajkavian and Chakavian), however, are not mutually intelligible even though they are usually subsumed under Serbo-Croatian. How these dialects should be classified in relation to Shtokavian remains a matter of dispute.

Macedonian, although largely mutually intelligible with Bulgarian and certain dialects of Serbo-Croatian (Torlakian), is considered by Bulgarian linguists to be a Bulgarian dialect, in contrast with the view in North Macedonia, which regards it as a language in its own right. Before the establishment of a literary standard of Macedonian in 1944, in most sources in and out of Bulgaria before the Second World War, the South Slavic dialect continuum covering the area of today's North Macedonia were referred to as Bulgarian dialects. Sociolinguists agree that the question of whether Macedonian is a dialect of Bulgarian or a language is a political one and cannot be resolved on a purely linguistic basis.

Lebanon

In Lebanon, a part of the Christian population considers "Lebanese" to be in some sense a distinct language from Arabic and not merely a dialect thereof. During the civil war, Christians often used Lebanese Arabic officially, and sporadically used the Latin script to write Lebanese, thus further distinguishing it from Arabic. All Lebanese laws are written in the standard literary form of Arabic, though parliamentary debate may be conducted in Lebanese Arabic.

North Africa

In Tunisia, Algeria, and Morocco, the Darijas (spoken North African languages) are sometimes considered more different from other Arabic dialects. Officially, North African countries prefer to give preference to the Literary Arabic and conduct much of their political and religious life in it (adherence to Islam), and refrain from declaring each country's specific variety to be a separate language, because Literary Arabic is the liturgical language of Islam and the language of the Islamic sacred book, the Qur'an. Although, especially since the 1960s, the Darijas are occupying an increasing use and influence in the cultural life of these countries. Examples of cultural elements where Darijas' use became dominant include: theatre, film, music, television, advertisement, social media, folk-tale books and companies' names.

Ukraine

The Modern Ukrainian language has been in common use since the late 17th century, associated with the establishment of the Cossack Hetmanate. In the 19th century, the Tsarist Government of the Russian Empire claimed that Ukrainian (or Little Russian, per official name) was merely a dialect of Russian (or Polonized dialect) and not a language on its own (same concept as for Belarusian language). That concepted was enrooted soon after the partitions of Poland. According to these claims, the differences were few and caused by the conquest of western Ukraine by the Polish-Lithuanian Commonwealth. However, in reality the dialects in Ukraine were developing independently from the dialects in the modern Russia for several centuries, and as a result they differed substantially.

Following the Spring of Nations in Europe and efforts of the Brotherhood of Saints Cyril and Methodius, across the so called "Southwestern Krai" of Russian Empire started to spread cultural societies of Hromada and their Sunday schools. Themselves "hromadas" acted in same manner as Orthodox fraternities of Polish-Lithuanian Commonwealth back in 15th century. Around that time in Ukraine becoming popular political movements Narodnichestvo (Narodniks) and Khlopomanstvo.

Moldova
There have been cases of a variety of speech being deliberately reclassified to serve political purposes. One example is Moldovan. In 1996, the Moldovan parliament, citing fears of "Romanian expansionism", rejected a proposal from President Mircea Snegur to change the name of the language to Romanian, and in 2003 a Moldovan–Romanian dictionary was published, purporting to show that the two countries speak different languages. Linguists of the Romanian Academy reacted by declaring that all the Moldovan words were also Romanian words; while in Moldova, the head of the Academy of Sciences of Moldova, Ion Bărbuţă, described the dictionary as a politically motivated "absurdity".

Greater China

Unlike languages that use alphabets to indicate their pronunciation, Chinese characters have developed from logograms that do not always give hints to their pronunciation. Although the written characters have remained relatively consistent for the last two thousand years, the pronunciation and grammar in different regions have developed to an extent that the varieties of the spoken language are often mutually unintelligible. As a series of migration to the south throughout the history, the regional languages of the south, including Gan, Xiang, Wu, Min, Yue and Hakka often show traces of Old Chinese or Middle Chinese. From the Ming dynasty onward, Beijing has been the capital of China and the dialect spoken in Beijing has had the most prestige among other varieties. With the founding of the Republic of China, Standard Mandarin was designated as the official language, based on the spoken language of Beijing. Since then, other spoken varieties are regarded as fangyan (regional speech). Cantonese is still the most commonly-used language in Guangzhou, Hong Kong, Macau and among some overseas Chinese communities, whereas Hokkien has been accepted in Taiwan as an important local language alongside Mandarin.

Interlingua 

Interlingua was developed so that the languages of Western civilization would act as its dialects. Drawing from such concepts as the international scientific vocabulary and Standard Average European, researchers at the International Auxiliary Language Association extracted words and affixes to be part of Interlingua's vocabulary. In theory, speakers of the Western languages would understand written or spoken Interlingua immediately, without prior study, since their own languages were its dialects. Interlingua could be used to assist in the learning of other languages. The vocabulary of Interlingua extends beyond the Western language families.

Selected list of articles on dialects 

Varieties of Arabic
Bengali dialects
Catalan dialects
Varieties of Chinese
Cypriot Greek
Cypriot Turkish
Danish dialects
Dutch dialects
English dialects
Finnish dialects
Varieties of French
Georgian dialects
German dialects
Malayalam languages
Varieties of Malay
Connacht Irish, Munster Irish, Ulster Irish
Italian dialects
Japanese dialects
Korean dialects
Norwegian dialects
Nguni languages
Dialects of Polish
Portuguese dialects
Romanian dialects
Russian dialects
Slavic microlanguages
Slovenian dialects
Spanish dialects
Swedish dialects
Sri Lankan Tamil dialects
Yiddish dialects

See also 

Accent perception
Chronolect
Colloquialism
Creole language
Dialect levelling
Dialectology
Dialectometry
Ethnolect
Eye dialect
Idiolect
Isogloss
Koiné language
Register (sociolinguistics)
Literary language
Nation language
Regional language
Sprachbund

References

External links 

 Sounds Familiar? – Listen to regional accents and dialects of the UK on the British Library's 'Sounds Familiar' website
 International Dialects of English Archive Since 1997
 thedialectdictionary.com – Compilation of Dialects from around the globe
 A site for announcements and downloading the SEAL System
 

 
Language
Language varieties and styles
Lexicology
Linguistics terminology